The University of Massachusetts Amherst College of Education is a college at the University of Massachusetts Amherst. Began in 1906 as the Department of Agricultural Education, changing its name to the Department of Education in 1932, and was organized as the School of Education starting in 1955. The school was first accredited in 1962. The college offers both undergraduate and graduate programs.

The college houses the journal Equity and Excellence in Education that addresses social justice issues in education.

References

External links 
 College of Education official site

Schools of education in Massachusetts
University of Massachusetts Amherst schools
University subdivisions in Massachusetts